Jinnah Bridge is a circular flyover located between Kharadar and Kiamari on Chinna Creek in Karachi, Pakistan. Until 1982, the bridge was known as Napier Mole Bridge. It was upgraded and developed into a circular one-way flyover between 1993 and 1997. The bridge connects Karachi port to the city, and is the southwest terminus of Mohammad Ali Jinnah Road. Port Grand Food and Entertainment Complex food street is located in the centre of the flyover.

References

Bridges in Karachi
Bridges in Pakistan
Memorials to Muhammad Ali Jinnah